Canterbury Cathedral in Canterbury, Kent, is one of the oldest and most famous Christian structures in England. It forms part of a World Heritage Site. It is the cathedral of the Archbishop of Canterbury, currently Justin Welby, leader of the Church of England and symbolic leader of the worldwide Anglican Communion.  Its formal title is the Cathedral and Metropolitical Church of Christ at Canterbury.

Founded in 597, the cathedral was completely rebuilt between 1070 and 1077. The east end was greatly enlarged at the beginning of the 12th century and largely rebuilt in the Gothic style following a fire in 1174, with significant eastward extensions to accommodate the flow of pilgrims visiting the shrine of Thomas Becket, the archbishop who was murdered in the cathedral in 1170. The Norman nave and transepts survived until the late 14th century when they were demolished to make way for the present structures.

Before the English Reformation the cathedral was part of a Benedictine monastic community known as Christ Church, Canterbury, as well as being the seat of the archbishop.

History

Roman 
Christianity in Britain is referred to by Tertullian as early as 208 AD. Origen mentions the church in 238 AD and in 314 Britain sent three Bishops to the Council of Arles.

There is a medieval London tradition that St Peter upon Cornhill church in London was the seat of English Christianity until the founding of Canterbury in 597 AD. Whether this is true or not has not yet been established. However, St Peter's is positioned directly above the potential location of a pagan Aedes (or shrine room) in the great Roman Basilica of London, and there is a tradition that a native British King, Lucius, converted to Christianity in 179 AD and founded St Peter's as the seat of the archbishop of English church.

Either way, Canterbury was therefore a relative latecomer to English Christianity. The cathedral's first bishop was Augustine of Canterbury, previously abbot of St Andrew's Benedictine Abbey in Rome; when other dioceses were founded in England he was made archbishop. He was sent by Pope Gregory I in 596 as a missionary to the English. Augustine founded the cathedral in 597 and dedicated it to Jesus Christ, the Holy Saviour.

Augustine also founded the Abbey of St Peter and Paul outside the city walls. This was later rededicated to St Augustine himself and was for many centuries the burial place of the successive archbishops. The abbey is part of the World Heritage Site of Canterbury, along with the cathedral and the ancient Church of St Martin.

Early Medieval 
Bede recorded that Augustine reused a former Roman church. The oldest remains found during excavations beneath the present nave in 1993 were, however, parts of the foundations of an Anglo-Saxon building, which had been constructed across a Roman road. They indicate that the original church consisted of a nave, possibly with a narthex, and side-chapels to the north and south. A smaller subsidiary building was found to the south-west of these foundations. During the 9th or 10th century this church was replaced by a larger structure with a  squared west end. It appears to have had a square central tower. The 11th-century chronicler Eadmer, who had known the Saxon cathedral as a boy, wrote that, in its arrangement, it resembled St Peter's in Rome, indicating that it was of basilican form, with an eastern apse.

During the reforms of Dunstan, archbishop from 960 until his death in 988, a Benedictine abbey named Christ Church Priory was added to the cathedral. Dunstan was buried on the south side of the high altar.

Anglo-Saxon King Æthelred the Unready and Norman-born Emma of Normandy were married at Canterbury Cathedral in the Spring of 1002, and Emma was consecrated "Queen Ælfgifu".

The cathedral was badly damaged during Danish raids on Canterbury in 1011. The Archbishop, Ælfheah, was taken hostage by the raiders and eventually killed at Greenwich on 19 April 1012, the first of Canterbury's five martyred archbishops. After this a western apse was added as an oratory of Saint Mary, probably during the archbishopric of Lyfing (1013–1020) or Aethelnoth (1020–1038).

The 1993 excavations revealed that the new western apse was polygonal, and flanked by hexagonal towers, forming a westwork. It housed the archbishop's throne, with the altar of St Mary just to the east. At about the same time that the westwork was built, the arcade walls were strengthened and towers added to the eastern corners of the church.

Norman 
The cathedral was destroyed by fire in 1067, a year after the Norman Conquest. Rebuilding began in 1070 under the first Norman archbishop,  Lanfranc (1070–1077). He cleared the ruins and reconstructed the cathedral to a  design based closely on that of the  Abbey of Saint-Étienne in Caen, where he had previously been abbot, using stone brought from France. The new church, its central axis about 5 m south of that of its predecessor, was a cruciform building, with an aisled nave of nine bays, a pair of towers at the west end,  aisleless transepts with apsidal chapels, a low crossing tower, and a short quire ending in three apses. It was dedicated in 1077.

Under Lanfranc's successor Anselm, who was twice exiled from England, the responsibility for the rebuilding or improvement of the cathedral's fabric was largely left in the hands of the priors.  Following the election of Prior Ernulf in 1096, Lanfranc's inadequate east end was demolished, and replaced with an eastern arm 198 feet long,  doubling the length of the cathedral. It was raised above a large and elaborately decorated crypt. Ernulf was succeeded in 1107 by Conrad, who completed the work by 1126. The new quire took the form of a complete church in itself, with its own transepts; the east end was  semicircular in plan, with three chapels opening off an ambulatory. A free-standing campanile was built on a mound in the cathedral precinct in about 1160.

As with many Gothic church buildings, the interior of the quire was richly embellished. William of Malmesbury wrote: "Nothing like it could be seen in England either for the light of its glass windows, the gleaming of its marble pavements, or the many-coloured paintings which led the eyes to the paneled ceiling above."

Though named after the 6th-century founding archbishop, the Chair of St Augustine, the ceremonial enthronement chair of the Archbishop of Canterbury, may date from the Norman period. Its first recorded use is in 1205.

Plantagenet period

Martyrdom of Thomas Becket 

A pivotal moment in the history of the cathedral was the murder of the archbishop,  Thomas Becket, in the north-west transept (also known as the Martyrdom) on Tuesday 29 December 1170, by knights of King Henry II. The king had frequent conflicts with the  strong-willed Becket and is said to have exclaimed in frustration, "Will no one rid me of this turbulent priest?" Four knights took it literally and murdered Becket in his own cathedral. After the Anglo-Saxon Ælfheah, Becket was the second Archbishop of Canterbury to be murdered.

The posthumous veneration of Becket transformed the cathedral into a place of pilgrimage, necessitating both expansion of the building and an increase in wealth, via revenues from pilgrims, in order to make expansion possible.

Rebuilding of the quire 

In September 1174 the quire  was severely damaged by fire, necessitating a major reconstruction,  the progress of which was recorded in detail by a monk named Gervase. Everything else was replaced in the new Gothic style, with pointed arches, rib vaulting, and flying buttresses. The limestone used was imported from Caen in Normandy, and Purbeck marble was used for the shafting. The quire was back in use by 1180 and in that year the remains of Dunstan and Ælfheah were moved there from the crypt.

The master-mason appointed to rebuild the quire was a Frenchman, William of Sens. Following his injury in a fall from the scaffolding in 1179 he was replaced by one of his former assistants, known as "William the Englishman".

Trinity Chapel and Shrine of Thomas Becket 

In 1180–1184, in place of the old, square-ended, eastern chapel, the present Trinity Chapel was constructed, a broad extension with an ambulatory, designed to house the shrine of St Thomas Becket. A further chapel, circular in plan, was added beyond that, which housed further relics of Becket, widely believed to have included the top of his skull, struck off in the course of his assassination. This latter chapel became known as the "Corona" or "Becket's Crown". These new parts east of the quire transepts were raised on a higher crypt than Ernulf's quire, necessitating flights of steps between the two levels. Work on the chapel was completed in 1184, but Becket's remains were not moved from his tomb in the crypt until 1220. Further significant interments in the Trinity Chapel included those of Edward Plantagenet (The "Black Prince") and King Henry IV.

The shrine in the Trinity Chapel was placed directly above Becket's original tomb in the crypt. A marble plinth, raised on columns, supported what an early visitor, Walter of Coventry, described as "a coffin wonderfully wrought of gold and silver, and marvellously adorned with precious gems". Other accounts make clear that the gold was laid over a wooden chest, which in turn contained an iron-bound box holding Becket's remains. Further votive treasures were added to the adornments of the chest over the years, while others were placed on pedestals or beams nearby, or attached to hanging drapery. For much of the time, the chest (or "feretory") was kept concealed by a wooden cover, which would be theatrically raised by ropes once a crowd of pilgrims had gathered. The Dutch humanist Desiderius Erasmus, who visited in 1512–1514, recorded that, once the cover was raised, "the Prior ... pointed out each jewel, telling its name in French, its value, and the name of its donor; for the principal of them were offerings sent by sovereign princes."

The income from pilgrims (such as those portrayed in Geoffrey Chaucer's Canterbury Tales) who visited Becket's shrine, which was regarded as a place of healing, largely paid for the subsequent rebuilding of the cathedral and its associated buildings. This revenue included the profits from the sale of pilgrim badges depicting Becket, his martyrdom, or his shrine.

The shrine was removed in 1538. King Henry VIII summoned the dead saint to court to face charges of treason. Having failed to appear, he was found guilty in his absence and the treasures of his shrine  were confiscated, carried away in two coffers and 26 carts.

Monastic buildings 

A bird's-eye view of the cathedral and its monastic buildings, made in about 1165 and known as the "waterworks plan" is preserved in the Eadwine Psalter in the library of Trinity College, Cambridge. A detailed description of the plan can be found in the classic paper by Willis. It shows that Canterbury employed the same general principles of arrangement common to all Benedictine monasteries, although, unusually, the cloister and monastic buildings were to the north, rather than the south of the church. There was a separate chapter-house which still exists, said to be "the largest of its kind in all of England". Stained glass here depicts the history of Canterbury.

The buildings formed separate groups around the church. Adjoining it, on the north side, stood the cloister and the buildings devoted to the monastic life. To the east and west of these were those devoted to the exercise of hospitality. Also to the east was the infirmary, with its own chapel. To the north, a large open court divided the monastic buildings from menial ones, such as the stables, granaries, barn, bakehouse, brewhouse, and laundries, inhabited by the lay servants of the establishment. At the greatest possible distance from the church, beyond the precinct of the monastery, was the eleemosynary department. The almonry for the relief of the poor, with a great hall annexed, formed the paupers' hospitium.

The group of buildings devoted to monastic life included two cloisters. The great cloister was surrounded by the buildings essentially connected with the daily life of the monks: the church to the south, with the refectory placed as always on the side opposite, the dormitory, raised on a vaulted undercroft, and the chapter-house adjacent, and the lodgings of the cellarer, responsible for providing both monks and guests with food, to the west. A passage under the dormitory led eastwards to the smaller or infirmary cloister, appropriated to sick and infirm monks.

The hall and chapel of the infirmary extended east of this cloister, resembling in form and arrangement the nave and chancel of an aisled church. Beneath the dormitory, overlooking the green court or herbarium, lay the "pisalis" or "calefactory", the common room of the monks. It was constructed with  careful regard to hygiene, with a stream of water running through it from end to end.

A second smaller dormitory for the conventual officers ran from east to west. Close to the refectory, but outside the cloisters, were the domestic offices connected with it: to the north, the kitchen,  square, with a pyramidal roof, and the kitchen court; to the west, the butteries, pantries, etc. The infirmary had a small kitchen of its own. Opposite the refectory door in the cloister were two lavatories, where  the monks washed before and after eating. One of these is the circular two story lavatory tower. To the south of the infirmary cloister, close to the east end of the cathedral, is the treasury, with a distinctive octapartite vault.

The buildings devoted to hospitality were divided into three groups. The prior's group  were "entered at the south-east angle of the green court, placed near the most sacred part of the cathedral, as befitting the distinguished ecclesiastics or nobility who were assigned to him." The cellarer's buildings, where middle-class visitors were entertained, stood near the west end of the nave. The inferior pilgrims and paupers were relegated to the north hall or almonry, just within the gate.

Priors of Christ Church Priory included John of Sittingbourne (elected 1222, previously a monk of the priory) and William Chillenden, (elected 1264, previously monk and treasurer of the priory). The monastery was granted the right to elect their own prior if the seat was vacant by the pope, and – from Gregory IX onwards – the right to a free election (though with the archbishop overseeing their choice). Monks of the priory have included Æthelric I, Æthelric II, Walter d'Eynsham, Reginald fitz Jocelin (admitted as a confrater shortly before his death), Nigel de Longchamps and  Ernulf. The monks often put forward candidates for Archbishop of Canterbury, either from among their number or outside, since the archbishop was nominally their abbot, but this could lead to clashes with the king or pope should they put forward a different man – examples are the elections of Baldwin of Forde and Thomas Cobham.

14th and 15th centuries 
Early in the 14th century, Prior Eastry erected a stone quire screen and rebuilt the chapter house, and his successor, Prior Oxenden inserted a large five-light window into St Anselm's chapel.

The cathedral was seriously damaged by the 1382 Dover Straits earthquake, losing its bells and campanile.

From the late 14th century the nave and transepts were rebuilt, on the Norman foundations in the Perpendicular style under the direction of the noted master mason Henry Yevele. In contrast to the contemporary rebuilding of the nave at Winchester, where much of the existing fabric was retained and remodeled, the  piers were  entirely removed, and replaced with less bulky Gothic ones, and the old aisle walls were completely taken down except for a low "plinth" left on the south side. More Norman fabric was retained in the transepts, especially in the east walls, and the old apsidal chapels were not replaced until the mid-15th century. The arches of the new nave arcade were exceptionally high in proportion to the clerestory. The new transepts, aisles, and nave were roofed with lierne vaults, enriched with bosses. Most of the work was done during the priorate of Thomas Chillenden (1391–1411): Chillenden also built a new quire screen at the east end of the nave, into which Eastry's existing screen was incorporated. The Norman stone floor of the nave, however, survived until its replacement in 1786.

From 1396 the cloisters were repaired and remodeled by Yevele's pupil Stephen Lote who added the lierne vaulting. It was during this period that the wagon-vaulting of the chapter house was created.

A shortage of money and the priority given to the rebuilding of the cloisters and chapterhouse meant that the rebuilding of the west towers was neglected. The south-west tower was not replaced until 1458, and the Norman north-west tower survived until  1834 when it was replaced by a  replica of its Perpendicular companion.

In about 1430 the south transept apse was removed to make way for a chapel, founded by Lady Margaret Holland and dedicated to St Michael and  All Angels. The north transept apse was replaced by a Lady Chapel, built-in 1448–1455.

The  crossing tower was begun in 1433, although preparations had already been made during Chillenden's priorate when the piers had been reinforced. Further strengthening was found necessary around the beginning of the 16th century when buttressing arches were added under the southern and western tower arches.  The tower is often known as the "Angel Steeple", after a gilded angel that once stood on one of its pinnacles.

Modern period

The Reformation, Dissolution and Puritanism 

The cathedral ceased to be an abbey during the Dissolution of the Monasteries when all religious houses were suppressed. Canterbury surrendered in March 1539, and reverted to its previous status of 'a college of secular canons'. According to the cathedral's own website, it had been a Benedictine monastery since the 900s. The New Foundation came into being on 8 April 1541.
The shrine to St Thomas Becket was destroyed on the orders of Henry VIII and the relics lost.

In 1642–1643, during the English Civil War, Puritan iconoclasts led by Edwin Sandys (Parliamentarian) caused significant damage during their "cleansing" of the cathedral. Included in that campaign was the destruction of the statue of Christ in the Christ Church Gate and the demolition of the wooden gates by a group led by Richard Culmer. The statue would not be replaced until 1990 but the gates were restored in 1660 and a great deal of other repair work started at that time; that would continue until 1704.

Furnishings 
In 1688, the joiner Roger Davis, citizen of London, removed the 13th century misericords and replaced them with two rows of his own work on each side of the quire. Some of Davis's misericords have a distinctly medieval flavour and he may have copied some of the original designs. When Sir George Gilbert Scott carried out renovations in the 19th century, he replaced the front row of Davis' misericords, with new ones of his own design, which seem to include many copies of those  at Gloucester Cathedral, Worcester Cathedral and New College, Oxford.

Statues on the West Front 

Most of the statues that currently adorn the west front of the cathedral were installed in the 1860s when the South Porch was being renovated. At that time, the niches were vacant and the Dean of the cathedral thought that the appearance of the cathedral would be improved if they were filled. The Victorian sculptor Theodore Pfyffers was commissioned to create the statues and most of them were installed by the end of the 1860s. There are currently 53 statues representing various figures who have been influential in the life of the cathedral and the English church such as clergy, members of the royal family, saints, and theologians. Archbishops of Canterbury from Augustine of Canterbury and Lanfranc, to Thomas Cranmer and William Laud are represented. Kings and Queens from Æthelberht and Bertha of Kent, to Victoria and Elizabeth II are included.

18th century to the present 

The original towers of Christ Church Gate were removed in 1803 and were replaced in 1937. The statue of Christ was replaced in 1990 with a bronze sculpture of Christ by Klaus Ringwald.

The original Norman northwest tower, which had a lead spire until 1705, was demolished in 1834 owing to structural concerns. It was replaced with a Perpendicular-style twin of the southwest tower (designed by Thomas Mapilton), now known as the "Arundel Tower", providing a more symmetrical appearance for the cathedral. This was the last major structural alteration to the cathedral to be made.

In 1866, there were six residentiary canonries, of which one was annexed to the Archdeaconry of Canterbury and another to that of Maidstone. In September 1872, a large portion of the Trinity Chapel roof was completely destroyed by fire. There was no significant damage to the stonework or interior and the damage was quickly repaired.

During the bombing raids of the Second World War its library was destroyed, but the cathedral did not sustain extensive bomb damage; the local Fire Wardens doused any flames on the wooden roof.

In 1986, a new Martyrdom Altar was installed in the northwest transept, on the spot where Thomas Becket was slain, the first new altar in the cathedral for 448 years. Mounted on the wall above it, there is a metal sculpture by Truro sculptor Giles Blomfield depicting a cross flanked by two bloodstained swords which, together with the shadows they cast, represent the four knights who killed Becket. A stone plaque also commemorates Pope John Paul II's visit to the United Kingdom in 1982. Antony Gormley's sculpture Transport was unveiled in the crypt in 2011. It is made from iron nails from the roof of the south-east transept.

In 2015, Sarah Mullally and Rachel Treweek became the first women to be ordained as bishops in the cathedral, as Bishop of Crediton and Bishop of Gloucester respectively. In 2022, it was announced that David Monteith, who is openly gay and in a civil partnership, would serve as Dean of the Cathedral.

The cathedral is Regimental Church of the Princess of Wales's Royal Regiment and a graduation venue for the University of Kent and Canterbury Christ Church University.

Conservation 
Much of the stonework at Canterbury Cathedral is damaged and crumbling, the roofs are leaking and much of the stained glass is badly corroded. The last quinquennial structural review revealed that a combination of centuries of weathering, pollution and constant use had taken its toll on the ancient building and some serious problems were in need of urgent action.

The single biggest challenge is the roof. The cathedral is covered by a huge expanse of lead and whilst the majority of the wooden framework remains sound, much of the lead itself needs replacing. In addition, a large amount of concrete encasing the bottom of the roof beams needs to be removed and replaced with traditional wooden footers.

Conservation of the external masonry, particularly on the northern side of the building, is equally important. The cathedral is in part built of Caen stone. Detailed archaeological studies are undertaken to identify exactly which stones need to be replaced or repaired. In addition, specialist cleaning techniques are used to remove accumulated chemical deposits which are very damaging to the building. As regards the interior, priorities include decoration of the vaults of the Trinity Chapel, conservation work in several other chapels, and major improvements to the Treasury building, which contains, amongst other things, the choir practice rooms.

The earliest coloured glass windows in the cathedral date from the late 12th century, whilst others are as new as the four Ervin Bossányi windows in the south-east transept (1957). Many have already been conserved and protected by the team of stained glass conservators led by Leonie Seliger. However, much conservation work remains to be done, notably on the Oculus window in the south-east transept – a late 12th-century round window.

During the autumn of 2008, a major restoration of the lead roof over the transept was completed at a cost of approximately £500,000. In 2018, the lead roof of the nave was replaced. The extensive restoration of the cathedral that was underway in mid-2018 was part of a 2016–2021 schedule that also includes improved landscaping and accessibility, new visitor facilities and a general external restoration. The so-called Canterbury Journey project was expected to cost nearly £25 million; the funding included a £13.8 million Heritage Lottery grant, £10.9 million from the Canterbury Cathedral Trust and £250,000 from the Friends of the Cathedral.

Foundation 

The Foundation is the authorised staffing establishment of the cathedral, few of whom are clergy. The head of the cathedral is the Dean, currently David Monteith, who is assisted by a chapter of 30 canons, four of whom are residentiary, the others being honorary appointments of senior clergy in the diocese. There are also a number of lay canons who all together form the greater chapter which has the legal responsibility both for the cathedral itself and also for the formal election of an archbishop when there is a vacancy-in-see. By English law and custom, they may only elect the person who has been nominated by the monarch on the advice of the prime minister. The Foundation also includes the choristers, lay clerks, organists, King's Scholars, the Six Preachers and a range of other officers; some of these posts are moribund, such as that of the cathedral barber. The cathedral has a workforce of over 300 (many of whom work part-time), and approximately 800 volunteers.

Dean and Chapter 
As of 1 August 2022:
Dean – David Monteith (since 17 December 2022)
Archdeacon of Canterbury and Canon Residentiary – William Adam (Archdeacon and Canon since 18 July 2022 collation)
Canon Librarian – Tim Naish (since 22 April 2018)
Canon Missioner – Emma Pennington (since 16 March 2019)
Canon Treasurer (Diocesan Canon) – Andrew Dodd (since 27 September 2020 installation)

The Cathedral uses "Vice Dean" not of one particular appointee, but to refer to the Canon in Residence for each month.

Minor canons:
Precentor – David Roper (interim, since 11 September 2022)

Finance 
Canterbury Cathedral receives no government or state funding and only occasional grants from English Heritage. It is not funded by the Church of England. The Church Commissioners pay the salary of the dean and two of the residentiary canons only. The cathedral is therefore largely self-funded.

It costs around £20,000 per day to ensure the Cathedral is a safe and beautiful place to visit and worship in. (2023)  In order to meet these costs the cathedral has to rely on income from entry fees paid by visitors and a number of commercial operations such as property rental, the Cathedral Shop, as well as the Cathedral Lodge Hotel and Conference Centre.

Appeal 
The "Save Canterbury Cathedral" appeal was launched in October 2006 to protect and enhance the cathedral's future as a centre of worship, heritage and culture. The aim was to raise £50 million; by the end of 2010 the appeal had raised £11.5 million, and as at May 2014 over £20 million had been raised.

The core part of the fundraising programme is focused on the cathedral's fabric. The major conservation-restoration projects already identified will cost £30 million. Fabric conservation is the most urgent element of the campaign. The appeal – the third of its kind following major fundraising drives at Canterbury in the 1950s and 1970s – was launched to fund these projects. Fundraising for the appeal will take place over a number of years both nationally and internationally, stressing the cathedral's role as the mother church of the worldwide Anglican Communion and as a World Heritage Site. An integrated conservation programme that addresses the priority areas has been drawn up by the cathedral's Surveyor to the Fabric, John Burton.

Major repair and conservation projects to be funded by the appeal include roofs of the nave, aisles, and North West and South East Transepts; stone carvings, pinnacles and stone facings of the Bell Harry Tower; work on the North side of the Corona Chapel; conservation of the Christ Church Gate entry to the Precincts; conservation of stained glass and surrounding stonework throughout the cathedral; and preservation of the collection of historic books and manuscripts.

In addition, there are plans to refurbish the cathedral pipe organ and renovations to the Choir House have already been completed, providing better facilities for choristers. Improvements are planned to the fabric of the library buildings and to the cathedral's audio-visual and lighting systems which will significantly benefit visitors including the disabled, visually impaired and hard of hearing. The appeal also aims to develop the outmoded workshop area and stained glass studio, in order to ensure the survival of Canterbury as a centre of excellence for vital craft skills and to promote a sustainable maintenance base for work on the cathedral which can be viewed by the public.

The fundraising group is the Canterbury Cathedral Trust, an independent, registered charity (1112590) seeking funds to provide conservation, craftsmanship, music and education. Since mid-2017, the Chief Executive has been Sarah Frankland. The Trust was able to obtain the £24.7m needed for The Canterbury Journey multi-year restoration programme which should be completed in 2021. In 2016–17 the Trust received £3.66m in donations and an additional £1.61m had been pledged for future projects. The next plan was to raise funds to restore and improve the Quire organ by 2020. In 2017, the cathedral was planning to have the new Welcome Centre open in 2019, with exhibition spaces and viewing gallery.

Police service 
The cathedral has its own police service, known as the Canterbury Cathedral Close Constables. They are attested Constables, with powers of arrest, who police and protect the Cathedral and Close. They also work with Kent Police.

Music 
Polyphonic music written for the monks of Christ Church Priory, now Canterbury Cathedral, survives from the 13th century. The cathedral may have had an organ as early as the 12th century, though the names of organists are only recorded from the early 15th century.
One of the earliest named composers associated with Canterbury Cathedral was Leonel Power, who was appointed master of the new Lady Chapel choir formed in 1438.

The Reformation brought a period of decline in the cathedral's music which was revived under Dean Thomas Neville in the early 17th century. Neville introduced instrumentalists into the cathedral's music who played cornett and sackbut, probably members of the city's band of waits. The cathedral acquired sets of recorders, lutes and viols for the use of the choir boys and lay-clerks.

Organ 

The organ at Canterbury is of four manuals and is in both south and the north quire aisles, as well as a nave division. It was built in 1886 by Henry Willis and subsequently rebuilt by the same firm in the mid-20th century. It was rebuilt by N. P. Mander in 1978 and reduced to three manuals at about that time. David Flood, Organist and Master of the Choristers for over 40 years, oversaw the redesign, specification and total expansion and rebuilding project of the Cathedral Organ in 2018–2020 The organ has now been fully restored and greatly enlarged, including reinstating the fourth manual, by Harrison and Harrison with work finishing in February 2020.

Organists 

Organists and assistant organists at Canterbury Cathedral have included composers Clement Charlton Palmer, Gerald Hocken Knight and Philip Moore and musical directors Allan Wicks and Stephen Darlington. Following 42 years as both Assistant Organist and Organist and Master of the Choristers, David Flood retired on 29 December 2020. Following 10 years as Assistant Organist and latterly Director of the Girls' Choir and a period as Acting Director of Music, David Newsholme was appointed Director of Music in July 2021. The Assistant Organist is Jamie Rogers and he was appointed in December 2021.

Choirs 
There has been a choral tradition at Canterbury Cathedral for 1400 years. The cathedral choir consists of up to 25 boy choristers and 12 lay clerks and choral scholars. The boys are aged eight to thirteen. They receive scholarships and attend St Edmund's School, Canterbury. There are seven choral services a week with Choral Evensong at 5:30 pm Monday through Friday, with the boys alone on Thursday and men on Wednesday. On Saturday and Sunday, there is evensong at 3:15 pm or 5:30pm and Eucharist on Sunday at 11 am. There are numerous extra services, especially at Christmas, Easter, and Pentecost.

The Girls' Choir of Canterbury Cathedral was founded in 2014 and their first performance at Evensong, in January, was attended by more than 600 people and widely covered by the international press. They gave their first concert in December of that year. They now share their duties equally with the boys of the choir and sometimes work together. The girls are aged 12 to 18. They attend local schools in Canterbury and some further afield.

Bells 

The cathedral has a total of 21 bells in the three towers:

The South West Tower (Oxford Tower) contains the cathedral's main ring of bells, hung for change ringing in the English style. There are fourteen bells – a ring of twelve with two semitones, which allow for ringing on ten, eight or six bells while still remaining in tune. All of the bells were cast in 1981 by the Whitechapel Bell Foundry from seven bells of the old peal of twelve with new metal added and rehung in a new frame. The length (draught) of the ropes was increased by lowering the floor of the ringing chamber to the level of the south aisle vault at the same time, also allowing for the new bells to be set lower in the belfry than the old, with the intention of reducing stress on the Medieval structure. The heaviest bell (tenor) of this ring weighs . The ringers practise on Thursday at 7:15 pm.

The North West Tower (Arundel Tower) contains the cathedral's clock chime. The five-quarter chimes were taken from the old peal of twelve in the Oxford Tower (where the clock was originally), and hung from beams in the Arundel Tower. The chimes are struck on the eighth Gregorian tone, which is also used at Merton College, Oxford.

Later, in 1343, Prior Hathbrand gave bells dedicated to Jesus and St Dunstan. At this time the bells in campanile were rehung and their names recorded as "Jesus", "Dunstan", "Mary", "Crundale", "Elphy" (Ælfheah) and "Thomas". In the 1382 Dover Straits earthquake the campanile fell, destroying the first three named bells. Following its reconstruction, the other three bells were rehung, together with two others, of whose casting no record remains.

The oldest bell in the cathedral is Bell Harry (approximately ), which hangs in a cage on the top of the central tower to which the bell lends its name.  This bell was cast by Joseph Hatch in 1635, and is struck at 8 am and 9 pm every day to announce the opening and closing of the cathedral, and also occasionally for services as a Sanctus bell.

The cathedral also has custody of the bell of HMS Canterbury, a World War I-era light cruiser, hung near the Buffs Chapel in the southwest transept.

Library 

The cathedral library has a collection of about 30,000 books and pamphlets printed before the 20th century and about 20,000 later books and serials. Many of the earlier books were acquired as part of donated collections. It is rich in church history, older theology, British history (including local history), travel, science and medicine, and the anti-slavery movement. The library's holdings are included in the online catalogue of the library of the University of Kent.

In July 2018, the cathedral purchased at auction a medieval Trussel Bible for £100,000. This bible, subsequently renamed the "Lyghfield Bible", after the monk William Lighfyld, had previously been at Canterbury, being removed following the Dissolution.

See also

References

Footnotes

Notes

Bibliography

Further reading 

Butler, John (2011), The Red Dean of Canterbury: the Public and Private Faces of Hewlett Johnson, Scala Publishing, 
Best, Nicholas (2019), Bell Harry, Endeavour Media
Foyle, Jonathan (2013), The Architecture of Canterbury Cathedral, Scala Arts and Heritage Publishers, 
Guy, John (2012), Thomas Becket: Warrior, Priest, Rebel, Random House, 
Keates, Jonathan & Hornak, Angelo (2013), Canterbury Cathedral, Scala Arts and Heritage Publishers, 
Michael, M. A. (2004), The Stained Glass of Canterbury Cathedral, Scala Arts and Heritage Publishers, 
Newman, John (2013), Pevsner's Buildings of England, Kent: North and North East, New Haven: Yale University Press, 
Rudolph, Conrad, "The Parabolic Discourse Window and the Canterbury Roll: Social Change and the Assertion of Elite Status at Canterbury Cathedral," Oxford Art Journal 38 (2015) 1-19
Sparks, Margaret (2007), Canterbury Cathedral Precincts: an historical survey, Canterbury: Dean & Chapter of Canterbury, 
Sparks, Margaret & Brayshaw, Karen (2011) The Library of Canterbury Cathedral. Canterbury: Friends of Canterbury Cathedral, 
Weaver, Jeffrey (2013) The Ancestors of Christ Windows at Canterbury Cathedral. Los Angeles: Getty Publications,

External links 

 
 Sacred Destinations: Canterbury Cathedral
 Details on bell towers
 Canterbury Cathedral on Adrian Fletcher's Paradoxplace
 BBC news item re. Caen stone sourced for cathedral repairs
 Photos and plans of Canterbury Cathedral

 
6th-century churches
Churches completed in 1077
Anglican cathedrals in England
Anglo-Saxon cathedrals
Benedictine monasteries in England
Pre-Reformation Roman Catholic cathedrals
Church of England church buildings in Kent
Anglican pilgrimage sites
Catholic pilgrimage sites
Episcopacy in Anglicanism
Grade I listed cathedrals
Grade I listed buildings in Kent
Christianity in Kent
Tourist attractions in Kent
World Heritage Sites in England
English churches with Norman architecture
English Gothic architecture in Kent
Basilicas (Church of England)
11th-century church buildings in England